Christian Dvorak (born February 2, 1996) is an American professional ice hockey forward for the Montreal Canadiens of the National Hockey League (NHL). Dvorak was drafted 58th overall by the Arizona Coyotes in the 2014 NHL Entry Draft.

Playing career

Junior
Dvorak started his playing career with the Chicago Mission U16 and U18 teams. After his impressive seasons in Chicago, he was chosen sixth overall in the USHL Futures Draft, and in the 8th Round of the 2012 OHL Draft. He played the 2012–13 season with the Chicago Steel in the United States Hockey League (USHL), but the following year decided to move to Canada to play for the London Knights of the OHL.

After the 2013–14 season, he was drafted in the second round of the NHL Entry Draft by the Arizona Coyotes, who also drafted his former teammates Max Domi and Brendan Burke.

His rise to stardom began in the 2014–15 season, where he was second on the team with a staggering 109 points, only behind Mitch Marner. On April 18, 2015, Dvorak signed his first professional contract, agreeing to a three-year, entry-level deal with the Arizona Coyotes. He was assigned on an amateur try-out contract to make his professional debut with AHL affiliate, the Portland Pirates.

Dvorak was named co-captain of the Knights at the beginning of the 2015–16 season, sharing the honor with Marner. Throughout the season, Dvorak played on the top line alongside teammates Marner and Matthew Tkachuk. At the season's end, he led the team with 121 points, surpassing his previous score.

Dvorak helped the London Knights win the 2016 Memorial Cup championship game at the ENMAX Centrium in Red Deer, Alberta to end his junior career.

Professional

Arizona Coyotes (2016–2021)
On November 3, 2016, Dvorak scored his first NHL goal on goalie Pekka Rinne to help clinch a win over the Nashville Predators. Dvorak also chipped in an assist on a goal scored by Anthony Duclair to tie the game. It was the first multi-point game of Dvorak's NHL career.

On October 30, 2017, Dvorak scored his first goal of the 2017–18 season to help the Coyotes defeat the Philadelphia Flyers and avoid setting a new NHL record with a 12th-straight loss to start the season. On August 9, 2018, Dvorak signed a six-year contract extension with the Coyotes.

Dvorak began the 2018–19 season sidelined due to a pectoral muscle injury. On October 19, it was announced Dvorak underwent surgery to repair the torn pectoral muscle and was expected to take months to recover.

Montreal Canadiens (2021–present)
On September 4, 2021, Dvorak was traded by the Coyotes to the Montreal Canadiens in exchange for a 2022 first-round pick and a 2024 second-round pick. With the decision made by the Canadiens not to match an offer-sheet tendered to 2018 third overall selection Jesperi Kotkaniemi, the team suddenly had a void to fill at the center position. Already subject to trade rumors for an extended period, Dvorak was seen as an ideal candidate to fill the positional in need. Dvorak made his debut for the Canadiens on September 27, 2021 in a pre-season game against the Toronto Maple Leafs, where he scored a goal and added three assists. The regular season began with major challenges for both Dvorak and the Canadiens, who experienced a historically bad season that led to much of the management being sacked. Dvorak was injured in January and missed two months of play, but saw his output improve on his return under new coach Martin St. Louis. He finished the season with 11 goals and 22 assists in 56 games.

The 2022–23 season saw Dvorak register no points through his first seven games, attracting discussion as to how he was performing. He registered his first point of the season, assisting on a goal by linemate Brendan Gallagher, in his eighth game. Head coach St. Louis, when asked about the Dvorak line, remarked "they have to continue doing what they're doing. All the statistics we have on their game, all the chances they produce, the way they defend, they're very good, they just haven't gotten the results." On October 29, 2022, Dvorak scored his first career hat trick in 7–4 victory over the St. Louis Blues, notching two goals within minutes at the start of the third period and adding an empty netter at the end of the game. On March 7, 2023, he sustained a season-ending knee injury in a 4–3 shootout loss to the Carolina Hurricanes.

International play

Dvorak made his junior international debut when he played for the United States under-20 Hockey team in the 2016 World Junior Championships tournament, winning a bronze medal. He had scored eight points in seven games.

Personal life
Dvorak comes from a long line of elite athletes. Former NHL defenseman Radek Dvořák is Christian's cousin, and Ultimate Fighting Championship (UFC) fighter David Dvořák is his brother. David gives credit to Christian for his success in the UFC, stating that when they were kids Christian would wrestle him for the last popsicle in the freezer.

Career statistics

Regular season and playoffs

International

References

External links
 

1996 births
Living people
American men's ice hockey centers
American people of Czech descent
Arizona Coyotes draft picks
Arizona Coyotes players
Chicago Steel players
Ice hockey players from Illinois
London Knights players
Montreal Canadiens players
Portland Pirates players
Tucson Roadrunners players